Henry Robert Purdy (28 August 1867 – 26 November 1922) was an Australian rules footballer who played with South Melbourne in the Victorian Football League (VFL).

Originally from the South Ballarat Football Club, he moved to Melbourne in 1886.

His son, also named Harry Purdy, also played football for South Melbourne in the 1910s.

Notes

External links 
		

1867 births
1922 deaths
Australian rules footballers from Victoria (Australia)
Sydney Swans players
Ballarat Football Club players